The Paratriathlon at the 2020 Summer Paralympics – Women's PTS2 event at the 2020 Paralympic Games took place at 06:31 on 28 August 2021 at the Odaiba Marine Park.

Results
Key : T = Transition; L = Lap

Source:

References

Paratriathlon at the 2020 Summer Paralympics